Harrison Ford is an American actor who has had a long and varied career in the entertainment industry across seven different decades. Ford made his film debut in 1966 and spent most of the first ten years of his career in small supporting roles in both films and television before rising to stardom for his portrayal of the iconic and heroic character Han Solo in the epic space opera films Star Wars (1977), The Empire Strikes Back (1980), Return of the Jedi (1983), and then again 32 years later in The Force Awakens  (2015) and The Rise of Skywalker (2019). In the early 1980s, his career soared to even bigger heights when he claimed the starring role of another heroic character Indiana Jones in the adventure films Raiders of the Lost Ark (1981), The Temple of Doom (1984), The Last Crusade (1989) and then again 19 years later in The Kingdom of the Crystal Skull (2008). He has also famously portrayed two literary characters brought to the silver screen: the anti-hero detective Rick Deckard in the neo-noir dystopian science fiction film Blade Runner (1982) and its sequel 35 years later Blade Runner 2049 (2017) and CIA analyst Jack Ryan in the spy thrillers Patriot Games (1992) and Clear and Present Danger (1994).

Ford also played a small role in the acclaimed war film Apocalypse Now in 1979 before becoming a very high-profile movie star in leading roles throughout the 1980s and 1990s with such films as the romantic dramatic thriller Witness with Kelly McGillis for which he received an Academy Award nomination for Best Actor, the romantic comedy-drama Working Girl with Melanie Griffith and Sigourney Weaver, the recovery drama Regarding Henry with Annette Bening, the man-on-the-run action-thriller The Fugitive with Tommy Lee Jones, and the romantic comedy-drama remake Sabrina with Julia Ormond, earning Golden Globe nominations for the latter two films.

In 1997, Ford starred as fictional U.S. President James Marshall opposite Gary Oldman in the political action-thriller Air Force One and then went on to play Russian submarine Captain Alexei Vostrikov opposite Liam Neeson in the Cold War-era thriller K-19: The Widowmaker in 2002, a film based on true events in which he also served as executive producer. He continued to diversify his choice of roles throughout the 2000s and 2010s, transitioning from leading man to character actor with such parts as cantankerous newsman Mike Pomeroy in the romantic comedy Morning Glory with Rachel McAdams and Diane Keaton, Colonel Woodrow Dolarhyde in the science fiction/western hybrid Cowboys & Aliens with Daniel Craig, real-life Brooklyn Dodgers general manager Branch Rickey in the historical sports drama 42 with Chadwick Boseman as Jackie Robinson, the no-nonsense Colonel Hyrum Graff in the science fiction adaptation of Orson Scott Card's novel Ender's Game with Ben Kingsley and Viola Davis, and the wounded aging lover William Jones in the romantic drama The Age of Adaline with Blake Lively and Ellen Burstyn. In 2019, Ford had his first voice performance in the animated film The Secret Life of Pets 2, and starred as John Thornton in an adaptation of Jack London's 1903 novel The Call of the Wild in 2020. He is set to reprise his role as Indiana Jones in a planned fifth installment of the franchise due for release in 2023. In 2022, Ford was announced to have been selected by Marvel Studios to replace the late William Hurt as Thaddeus  "Thunderbolt" Ross in the upcoming 2024 films Captain America: New World Order and Thunderbolts, set in the Marvel Cinematic Universe.

In addition to feature films and television, Ford has also narrated and participated in several documentaries.

Film

Documentary

Television

Video games

Audio CDs

References 

Male actor filmographies
American filmographies

External links